The Chief of the Army Staff (CEMAT) is the military head of the French Army. The chief directs the army staff and acts as the principal advisor to the Chief of the Defence Staff on subjects concerning the Army. As such, they ensure the operational preparedness of their service branch, express their need for military and civilian personnel, and are responsible for maintaining the discipline, morale and conduct of their troops. Special responsibilities can be assigned to them in relation to nuclear safety.

The chief does not have a fixed term, nor an attached rank. In practice, however, a term has never exceeded five years and all chiefs since the late 1950s have been five–stars generals (OF–09). They are assisted in their duties by the Major General of the Army who will deputise if needed.

General Pierre Schill is the current chief and has been serving since 22 July 2021.

History

Creation 
The office was originally created on 8 June 1871 as Chief of the General Staff of the Army. Following the fall of the Second French Empire, the central administration of the Ministry of War was reorganized. The Chief of Staff had full control of the operations of the army, military engineering services, military justice, and general resources such as the historic and geographic departments. The Chief reported directly to the Minister of War.

However, under some governments, the position was given a lesser importance and was attributed to a Général de brigade, the lowest of the two flag officer ranks existing at the time in the French Army. In normal circumstances, it was filled by a Général de division.

First World War 
In times of war, the Chief of Staff of the French Army took charge of general headquarters (Grand Quartier Général (1914–1919) (GQG)). During the First World War, the leader of the French Armies was variously referred to as generalissimo or commander-in-chief. In the closing years of the First World War I, the establishment of the Supreme War Council in 1917 led to overall command being held by General Ferdinand Foch, and by mid-1918 French Army Chief Philippe Pétain was subordinate to Foch. Although the war ended with the armistice in November 1918, the war-time organisation persisted until 1920.

Interwar 
During the interwar period, command of the French Army was divided between the vice president of the Superior War Council and the chief of the general staff of the Armies. Marshal Philippe Pétain was vice president from 1920 to 1931, when he was replaced by General Weygand. After Weygand retired in 1935 he was succeeded by Gamelin who held the two positions simultaneously.

Second World War 
The position was abolished during the Battle of France and not reestablished until the end of the war.

Postwar 
The modern-day office of Chief of Staff of the Army was created in 1951. The Chief is placed under the authority of the Chief of the Defence Staff and is member of the Chiefs of Staff committee.

Office holders

Third Republic

Fourth Republic

Fifth Republic

See also 
Chief of the Defence Staff
Chief of Staff of the Air Force
Chief of Staff of the Navy
Special Operations Command
Directorate General of the National Gendarmerie

References

Notes 

French Army
French military staff
France